Samuel Henry Sharman (November 2, 1879 – August 30, 1951) was an American sport shooter who competed in the 1924 Summer Olympics.

In 1924, he won the gold medal as member of the American team in the team clay pigeons competition. He also participated in the Individual trap and finished sixth.

He was born in Gallatin County, Montana and died in Los Angeles, California.

References

1879 births
1951 deaths
American male sport shooters
Shooters at the 1924 Summer Olympics
Olympic gold medalists for the United States in shooting
Olympic medalists in shooting
Medalists at the 1924 Summer Olympics
People from Gallatin County, Montana
Sportspeople from Montana